Adhemarius jamaicensis is a species of moth in the family Sphingidae. It was described by Rothschild and Jordan, in 1915, and is known from Jamaica.

Adults have been recorded in July, but there are probably at least two generations per year.

References

Adhemarius
Moths described in 1915
Moths of the Caribbean